There are a number of elementary schools named Mitchell Elementary School:

 Mitchell Elementary School (Richmond, British Columbia)
 Mitchell Elementary School (Mitchell, Illinois)